Capital punishment was abolished in Guinea. It was abolished under military law in 2017. The civilian death penalty was abolished in 2016. Guinea last executed in 2001. Prior to its abolition for ordinary crimes in 2016, Guinea was classified as Retentionist."

Guinea is not a state party to the Second Optional Protocol to the International Covenant on Civil and Political Rights.

References 

Guinea
Law of Guinea